Fati Abubakar  is a Nigerian photojournalist and documentary photographer.

Life and work 
Abubakar was born and raised in Maiduguri, Nigeria.

Her work has been published in The New York Times, CNN Africa, BBC and Voice of America. She works primarily to document the travails of Borno, including the Boko Haram insurgency. She has a project called Bits of Borno.

References 

Year of birth missing (living people)
Living people
Nigerian women photographers
Nigerian photojournalists
People from Maiduguri
Documentary photographers
Women photojournalists